Hniezdne is a village and municipality in Stará Ľubovňa District in the Prešov Region of northern Slovakia.

Etymology
The name is derived from Slavic gnězdo - a nest (modern , modern ; after the replacement of initial Proto-Slavic g > h), but the first mention is of German origin Knysen (1286). The Slovak name before 1948 was Gňazdá. The town belonged to a German language island. The German population was expelled in 1945.

History
In historical records the village was first mentioned in 1286.

Geography
The municipality lies at an altitude of 539 metres and covers an area of 17.981 km². It has a population of about 1397 people.

Demographics
According to the 2011 census, Hniezdne had 1,463 inhabitants, 91.46% declared Slovak nationality, 4.92% Romani, 0.82% German,  0.48% Rusyn, 0.48% Czech, 0.34% Ukrainian,  0.14% Polish, 0.07% Hungarian and 0.07% Croatian. 1.23% did not declare any nationality.

Genealogical resources
The records for genealogical research are available at the state archive "Statny Archiv in Levoca, Slovakia"

 Roman Catholic church records (births/marriages/deaths): 1624-1945 (parish A)

See also
 List of municipalities and towns in Slovakia

References

External links 
 
Surnames of living people in Hniezdne

Villages and municipalities in Stará Ľubovňa District